The women's singles competition of the racquetball events at the 2011 Pan American Games will be held from October 17–22 at the Racquetball Complex in Guadalajara, Mexico. The defending Pan American Games champion is Cheryl Gudinas of the United States, while the defending Pan American regional champion from 2011 is Rhonda Rajsich also of the United States.

Schedule
All times are Central Standard Time (UTC-6).

Round robin
The round robin will be used as a qualification round. Groups will be announced at the technical meeting the day before the competition begins.

Pool A

Pool B

Pool C

Pool D

Pool E

Playoffs

Finals

Top half

Bottom half

References

Racquetball at the 2011 Pan American Games
Racquetball at multi-sport events